Peter Gebrian (August 10, 1923 – May 6, 2005) was an American professional baseball player, scout and front office executive. After his playing career, Gebrian became a successful scout for several major league teams.

As a player, the right-hander appeared in 27 games pitched in Major League Baseball for the  Chicago White Sox. He was a United States Army veteran of World War II.

Nicknamed "Gabe", Gebrian spent the entire 1947 campaign with the White Sox, appearing as a relief pitcher in all but four of the 23 games in which he took the mound. In 66⅓ total innings pitched, he allowed 61 hits and 33 bases on balls, with 17 strikeouts.  He had no complete games but earned five saves coming out of the ChiSox' bullpen.

Among the players he signed was Ron Swoboda. From 1975 to 1980, he served as the Mets' director of minor league operations or scouting, and also was an assistant to the club's general manager, Joe McDonald. After leaving the Mets, he was an area scout for the Pittsburgh Pirates, based in Nutley, New Jersey, into the late 1980s.

References

External links

1923 births
2005 deaths
Albany Senators players
Baseball players from New Jersey
Chicago White Sox players
Hollywood Stars players
Hornell Maples players
Kansas City Blues (baseball) players
Major League Baseball pitchers
Newark Bears (IL) players
New York Mets executives
New York Mets scouts
New York Yankees scouts
Sportspeople from Bayonne, New Jersey
Pittsburgh Pirates scouts
United States Army personnel of World War II